"Broken Boy Soldier" is the title track and the third single to be released from the album Broken Boy Soldiers by The Raconteurs, on October 23, 2006 in the UK. This track was used in an episode of the NBC television series Life.

One of the B-sides to the single is a live rendition of "Headin' for the Texas Border" by Flamin' Groovies.

Track listing
CD
"Broken Boy Soldier"
"Broken Boy Soldier" (KCRW Session)
"Yellow Sun"

7" (F)
"Broken Boy Soldier"
"Headin' for the Texas Border" (Live)

7" (G)
"Broken Boy Soldier" (Live)
"Blue Veins" (KCRW Session)

Charts

Music video
The video for this song features a toy soldier getting built by going through an adventure-like journey that leads to a boy receiving the toy on his birthday and then destroying it.

Songs about soldiers
Songs about the military
2006 singles
The Raconteurs songs
Music videos directed by Floria Sigismondi
2006 songs
Third Man Records singles
Songs written by Brendan Benson
Songs written by Jack White